Frank Friedman Oppenheimer (August 14, 1912 – February 3, 1985) was an American particle physicist, cattle rancher, professor of physics at the University of Colorado, and the founder of the Exploratorium in San Francisco.

A younger brother of renowned physicist J. Robert Oppenheimer, Frank Oppenheimer conducted research on aspects of nuclear physics during the time of the Manhattan Project, and made contributions to uranium enrichment. After the war, Oppenheimer's earlier involvement with the American Communist Party placed him under scrutiny, and he resigned from his physics position at the University of Minnesota. Oppenheimer was a target of McCarthyism and was blacklisted from finding any physics teaching position in the United States until 1957, when he was allowed to teach science at a high school in Colorado. This rehabilitation allowed him to gain a position at the University of Colorado teaching physics. In 1969, Oppenheimer founded the Exploratorium in San Francisco, and he served as its first director until his death in 1985.

Early life and education 
Frank Friedman Oppenheimer was born in 1912 in New York City to Julius Oppenheimer and Ella Friedman. During his childhood, he studied painting. He also studied the flute under nationally known teacher George Barrera, becoming competent enough at the instrument to consider a career as a flautist.

Frank began his schooling at the Ethical Culture School, where he attended until seventh grade. The remainder of his high school education was completed at Fieldston School in Riverdale; a school operated by the Ethical Culture Society.

Frank eventually followed the advice of his older brother Robert, and became a professional physicist. He entered into studies at Johns Hopkins University in 1930, graduating three years later with a BS in physics. Afterwards, Frank studied for a year and a half at the Cavendish Laboratory in Cambridge, England, where he also earned a pilot's license. In 1935, he worked on the development of nuclear particle counters at the Institute di Arcetri in Florence, Italy.

While completing his PhD work at the California Institute of Technology, Oppenheimer became engaged to Jacquenette Quann, an economics student at the University of California, Berkeley; she was also active in the Young Communist League. In spite of Robert's recommendations, Frank and Jackie were married in 1936 and soon both joined the American Communist Party, also against the older brother's advice. Both Frank and his wife were atheists.

Frank Oppenheimer received his PhD in 1939 and completed two postdoctoral years at Stanford.

Physics career 

During World War II, Frank's older brother Robert became the director of the Los Alamos Laboratory, part of the Manhattan Project, the Allied effort to produce the first atomic weapons. From 1941 to 1945 Frank worked at the University of California Radiation Laboratory on the problem of uranium isotope separation under the direction of his brother's good friend, Ernest O. Lawrence. In late 1943 he arrived at the Los Alamos Laboratory, working directly under Kenneth T. Bainbridge. His responsibilities included the instrumentation for the Trinity test site, in New Mexico. In 1945 he was sent to the enrichment facility at Oak Ridge, Tennessee, to help monitor the equipment.

Oppenheimer was involved in the founding of the Association of Los Alamos Scientists, on August 30, 1945. This organization promoted international peaceful control of nuclear power. He later also joined the Federation of American Scientists, and was a member of the American Physical Society.

After the war, Oppenheimer returned to Berkeley, working with Luis Alvarez and Wolfgang Panofsky to develop the proton linear accelerator. In 1947 he took a position as assistant professor of physics at the University of Minnesota, where he participated in the discovery of heavy cosmic ray nuclei.

Political scrutiny and blacklisting 

On July 12, 1947, the Washington Times Herald reported that Oppenheimer had been a member of the Communist Party during the years 1937–1939.  At first, he denied these reports, but later admitted they were true.  In June 1949, as part of a larger investigation on the possible mishandling of "atomic secrets" during the war, he was called before the United States Congress House Un-American Activities Committee (HUAC). Before the committee, he testified that he and his wife had been members of the Communist Party for about three and a half years. In 1937 they had been involved in local attempts to desegregate the Pasadena public swimming pool, which was open to non-whites only on Wednesday, after which the pool was drained and the water replaced.

Oppenheimer said he and his wife had joined at a time when they sought answers to the high unemployment experienced in the United States during the later part of the Great Depression.  He refused to name others he knew to be members. This caused a media sensation—that J. Robert Oppenheimer's brother was an admitted former member of the Communist Party—and led to Frank resigning from his post at the University of Minnesota.

After being branded a Communist, Oppenheimer could no longer find work in physics in the US, and he was also denied a passport, preventing him from working abroad. Frank and Jackie eventually sold one of the Van Gogh paintings he had inherited from his father, and with the money bought  of ranch land near Pagosa Springs, Colorado, and spent nearly a decade as cattle ranchers.

Return to teaching 
In 1957, the Red Scare had lessened to the point that Oppenheimer was allowed to teach science at a local high school. Under Oppenheimer's tutelage, several students from Pagosa Springs High School took first prize at the Colorado State Science Fair. Within two years, supported by endorsements from physicists Hans Bethe, George Gamow, and Victor Weisskopf, Oppenheimer was offered a position at the University of Colorado teaching physics.

While returning to particle physics research, Oppenheimer also took an increasing interest in developing improvements in science education. He was eventually awarded a grant from the National Science Foundation to develop new pedagogical methods, which resulted in a "Library of Experiments"—nearly one hundred models of classical laboratory experiments which could be used in aiding the teaching of physics to elementary and high school children. These models would later become the core of the first exhibits at the Exploratorium. Oppenheimer also worked with the Physical Science Study Committee (PSSC), helping to develop a new high school physics curriculum in the immediate post-Sputnik years.

In his work, Oppenheimer followed the well-known old Latin principle Docendo discimus—"the best way to learn is to teach".

Exploratorium 

In 1965, Oppenheimer was awarded a Guggenheim Fellowship to study the history of physics and to conduct bubble chamber research at University College, London, where he was exposed to European science museums for the first time. Inspired, Frank devoted the next years of his life to creating a similar resource in the United States. Upon his return from Europe, he was offered a job planning a new branch of the Smithsonian Institution in Washington, DC, but he instead chose to work on setting up a completely independent new type of museum in San Francisco.

Four years later, in 1969, the Exploratorium opened its doors for the first time—an interactive museum of art, science, and human perception based on the philosophy that science should be fun and accessible for people of all ages, set within the north wing of the stately Palace of Fine Arts of San Francisco. Oppenheimer was able to fund the opening of the Exploratorium partly due to a grant from the San Francisco Foundation. The San Francisco Foundation gave a $50,000 grant to Oppenheimer to open the  facility. 

Oppenheimer served as the first director of the museum, and was personally involved in almost every aspect of its daily operations for the rest of his life. Frank had also visited the Tel Aviv Science Museum in 1965, and later used several of Ivan Moscovich's designs and exhibits in his revolutionary Exploratorium in San Francisco. There were no admission charges at the Exploratorium for a full twelve years after its opening. The first exhibits in the Exploratorium were constructed with the aid of the Stanford Linear Accelerator Center (SLAC) and the Ames Research Center (NASA).

Frank Oppenheimer had a lifelong belief in the importance of art in an equal and closely connected relationship to science.  He personally recruited artist Bob Miller to create Sun Painting, the first major art installation at the Exploratorium.  Another early work was the Tactile Dome (1971), by August Coppola (father of actor Nicolas Cage and brother of the film director Francis Coppola). This was a 3-dimensional tightly convoluted passage that was completely dark inside, and which visitors had to explore relying on the sense of touch, encountering many tactile experiences along the way. Both installations proved to be immensely popular, and renewed versions of both are still on display today. In 1974, Oppenheimer established an ongoing artist-in-residence program at the Exploratorium, regularly bringing in a succession of emerging and established artists working at the boundaries of art and science.

The Exploratorium aimed to introduce and inspire, as well as teach. The museum exposed people to science by means of human perception. It provides a form of "educational sightseeing" as well as the understanding of the underlying principles. Its intention was not to replace a science class, but rather to inspire people to learn about science. The exhibits were arranged and structured to allow for free access to any part of the museum. Oppenheimer wanted people to be able to explore the museum and learn at their own pace, following a path that made sense to them and stimulated their curiosity. The idea of having people explore the museum in a way that appeals to everyone was an essential element. Instead of tour guides, fifteen to twenty college students or secondary students, as well as some adults, were employed as "explainers". They demonstrate the exhibits and explain the principles involved all while circulating among visitors, rather than guiding them along. Oppenheimer strove to make learning a fun and enjoyable experience for all.

Final years 
In 1977, Oppenheimer was diagnosed with lymphoma, and underwent two years of successful chemotherapy. Oppenheimer's first wife Jacquenette, died in 1980. In 1982, he married Mildred "Millie" Danielson.

In 1983, lung cancer was discovered (he was a heavy smoker), and he underwent a lobectomy, in spite of which he continued to play the flute.  Oppenheimer still remained active, appearing at the Exploratorium nearly daily until the last few weeks of his life.  He died at home in Sausalito, California, on February 3, 1985.

Legacy 

Frank Oppenheimer died in 1985, leaving his second wife Mildred Danielson, son Michael, and daughter Judith.

Oppenheimer's papers and archives were transferred to the Bancroft Library at the University of California, Berkeley. Oppenheimer authored over 60 technical and nontechnical papers. The bulk of this collection covers his work in physics and education in the years leading up to his founding of the Exploratorium.  Also included are papers related to his investigation by the House Un-American Activities Committee (HUAC). Historical archives of the Exploratorium (1957—present) are also kept at the Bancroft. The University of Minnesota holds archives covering Oppenheimer's physics work during 1946–1959.

Oppenheimer considered the Exploratorium and its educational programs to be his most important accomplishment and legacy.  A collection of selected Oppenheimer papers on science, art, and education is available online at the Exploratorium website.

The Frank Oppenheimer Fellowship Fund was created at the Exploratorium to provide for the exchange of science museum personnel both nationally and internationally.

In media 
Interviewed by director Jon Else, Frank Oppenheimer appears throughout The Day After Trinity (1980), an Academy Award-nominated documentary about J. Robert Oppenheimer and the building of the atomic bomb.

Awards 

 Distinguished Service Award, University of Colorado
 Distinguished Alumni Award, Caltech
 Guggenheim Fellowship 1965
 Millikan Award, American Association of Physics Teachers (AAPT) 1973
 Distinguished Service Award, American Association of Museums (AAM) 1982
 Oersted Medal, American Association of Physics Teachers (AAPT) 1984
 Kirkwood Award for Distinguished Service, Caltech

See also 
 Hybrid arts
 Science education
 Science museums

References

External links 

 Oral history interview transcript with Frank Oppenheimer on 9 February 1973, American Institute of Physics, Niels Bohr Library & Archives - Session I
 Oral history interview transcript with Frank Oppenheimer on 9 February 1973, American Institute of Physics, Niels Bohr Library & Archives - Session II
 Caltech oral history interview
 Frank Oppenheimer site at the Exploratorium, including an archive of selected papers
 Annotated bibliography for Frank Oppenheimer from the Alsos Digital Library for Nuclear Issues
 Frank Oppenheimer Papers, 1946–1959, University of Minnesota Archives
 Guide to the Frank Oppenheimer Papers at The Bancroft Library
 Something Incredibly Wonderful Happens

1912 births
1985 deaths
People from Pagosa Springs, Colorado
California Institute of Technology alumni
Academics of University College London
Accelerator physicists
American atheists
American nuclear physicists
American people of German-Jewish descent
Ranchers from Colorado
Jewish American scientists
Jewish physicists
Johns Hopkins University alumni
Manhattan Project people
Victims of McCarthyism
Members of the Communist Party USA
Museum founders
Science education in the United States
20th-century American businesspeople
20th-century American educators
Fellows of the American Physical Society
Deaths from lung cancer